Norton Family (previously known as Online Family.Norton and Norton Online Family) is an American cloud-based parental control service. Norton Family is aimed at "fostering communication" involving parents and their children's online activities. Computer activities are monitored by the software client, and reports are published online.

Development
Symantec debuted a beta version of Online Family on February 17, 2009. Its debut coincided with Symantec's announcement of the Norton Online Family Advisory Council, a committee of experts in various child care fields who will test and provide insight on the beta. Citing a Rochester Institute of Technology study, the company intends to bridge the gap between the percentage of parents versus children who report no online supervision.

The software was renamed to OnlineFamily.Norton and released April 27, 2009, dubbed by Symantec as the Internet Safety Week. The service, valued at $60, will remain free indefinitely. Instituting a fee for the product has not been decided on. It was initially planned to become part of the upcoming Norton Internet Security, but has not yet been incorporated into Norton's security suite.

On 26 January 2018, Norton Family emailed all its users alerting an update of its pricing and the incorporation with Norton Security Premium. Norton Family declared it shall no longer provide free service and existing users were given 180 days to either purchase the Norton Family Premier or Norton Security Premium subscriptions.

Overview
Norton Family can monitor Internet, instant messenger, and social-networking sites' traffic. On shared computers, it depends on the Norton Safety Minder to enforce policies and report activities for individual accounts. Norton Family emphasizes transparency between parents and children, attempting to create "open" and "ongoing dialogue". A system tray icon is intended to make the software's presence known. Also, as a security company, Symantec decided not to introduce something spyware-like. The service integrates with the Transport Driver Interface, allowing it to control Internet access for any Internet-enabled application. Attempts to bypass Safety Minder are logged.

Norton Family blocks specific sites using nearly four dozen categories. It preconfigures this feature based on a birth date. While Norton Family does not analyze pages in real-time, uncategorized sites are queued for heuristic and manual review. On attempt to visit a blocked site, children may receive a pop-up warning and an explanatory note in the browser with space to appeal the block. Otherwise, children will receive a warning, with the option of continuing to the page. Whenever a rule is ignored, it is logged. To make log files easier to parse, advertisement URLs are omitted from logs.

The service can define when children have access to a computer Parents can define a range of hours when children are blocked, with separate settings for each child, weekdays and weekends. A daily time quota can be configured as well. Children receive a warning 15 minutes prior before blocks begin or a time limit is exceeded. The amount of time left can be checked via the Norton Family system tray icon. In the last minute before forced logout, children can postpone it by pressing a button, disabling the desktop and leaving only the Norton Family icon functional. Parents can then enter their credentials to grant a time extension. The time-management feature can also warn children, rather than cutting off access. Exceeding limits will result in a log entry. Time limits are enforced across multiple PCs. Changing the system time does not affect Online Family. The activity will be logged, however.

The tracking of search queries requires a compatible search engine must be used. An option to force search engines to filter objectionable material is present, although Google Encrypted Search may bypass it. The service can block the transmission of personal information. Parents first complete a blacklist of information which should not be communicated via IM or a social-networking site. Children will be presented with a warning message when attempting to share information via IM or a social-networking site, and the information will not be sent. Norton Family can also notify parents when children access social-networking sites, create an account, or misrepresent their age. This feature is browser-dependent; Internet Explorer or Firefox is required in Windows, and Safari or Firefox is required in Mac. Without a compatible browser, Norton Family can still record access to social-networking sites as part of monitoring Internet activities. Some people may consider this Spyware.

IM control manages traffic at the protocol level, allowing it jurisdiction over a wide range of desktop clients. There are three levels of control; at the strictest, children cannot chat with friends until each one has received parental approval. Attempting to start or respond to a conversation triggers a warning and an offer to send a message to parents asking for permission. The second level allow all chat connections. However, parents are notified about chats with new friends and such conversations are recorded. Parents can choose to block the friend, keep monitoring, or allow unmonitored chat. At the loosest level, any IM clients used are listed and the friends which children engage in conversation are listed, with options to block or monitor each friend.

Norton Family can e-mail parents when certain events occur. Notifications include the noted event, the child's name, and the time of the incident. Notifications are stamped in Eastern Time. Parents can choose which events trigger a notification, add e-mail addresses to forward notices to, and grant other parents full privileges over children. Reports of activities are also presented in the online console. Settings can be changed and applied almost instantaneously. Children will receive a pop-up announcing the updated rules. Rules can be overridden immediately by a parent.

As an international company, Norton Family also adopts multi-language. On the other hand, web filter may not work properly if some antivirus software run web protection at the same time, for example Avira Antivirus web protection.

See also
List of parental control software
List of content-control software
Content-control software
Parental controls

References

External links
 

Family
Gen Digital software
Internet safety
Proprietary software
Content-control software
2009 establishments in the United States
2009 establishments in California
American inventions